Peter William Ball (born 1932 in Croydon, UK) is an English-born botanist, plant collector, and plant taxonomist, specializing in caricology (the study of the genus Carex).

After completing his O-Levels in 1948, Ball studied at Whitgift School, where he was taught by Cecil Thomas Prime, co-author of The Shorter British Flora (1948). In 1952 Ball matriculated at the University of Leicester, where he studied under Tom G. Tutin. Ball graduated from the University of Leicester with a B.Sc. in 1955 and a Ph.D. in 1960. While he was a graduate student, he worked with Tutin on a revision of Salicornia for the second edition of Flora of the British Isles (1962). As a graduate student, he also worked, with the support of a Leverhulme Fellowship, from 1957 to 1959 at the University of Liverpool on the Flora Europaea project. After obtaining his doctorate he worked until 1969 on the Flora Europeae project with the support of a research fellowship.

He collected botanical specimens in Cheshire in 1960 and in Merionethshire in 1961.

Ball became in 1970 a professor of botany at the University of Toronto Mississauga (UTM), where he retired as professor emeritus. He is the author or co-author of many scientific articles, most of which deal with the genus Carex. He contributed to and co-edited, with Anton A. Reznicek and David F. Murray, the Cyperaceae section of the Flora of North America. Ball also contributed three articles to volume 4 of the Flora of North America.

Selected publications

References

External links
 
 

1932 births
Living people
20th-century British botanists
21st-century British botanists
20th-century Canadian botanists
Alumni of the University of Leicester
Academic staff of the University of Toronto Mississauga
British emigrants to Canada
21st-century Canadian botanists